Vladracula is a genus of fungi within the Rhytismataceae family.  It is named after Vlad Dracula.

References

External links
Vladracula at Index Fungorum

Leotiomycetes genera